Holman is an English and Dutch surname first recorded in Essex, England in the subsidy rolls of 1327. There are variants including: Hollman and Holeman. It is uncommon as a given name.

There a three main theories as to the meaning of the name, one occupational and two topographical:
"Holy man" – stemming from the Old English words Hol or Hool, meaning holy.
"Dweller in a hollow (hole)" – stemming from the Old English hohl, meaning hollow or hole.
"Dweller by a holly tree/Dweller on an island" – from Middle English holm, meaning holly or island.

Notable Holmans
People with the surname or its variants include:

 Adrian Holman (1895–1974), British diplomat
 Benjamin Holman (1930–2007), American newspaper and television reporter
 Bernard Holman (1941–1988), British-New Zealand artist
 Bill Holman (cartoonist) (1903–1987), American cartoonist
 Bill Holman (musician) (born 1927), American songwriter and musician
 Bob Holman, American poet
 Brad Holman (born 1968), American Major League Baseball pitcher
 Brett Holman (born 1984), Australian Association football forward
 Brian Holman (born 1965), American Major League Baseball pitcher
 C. Hugh Holman (1914–1981), American literary scholar
 Cal Holman (1931–2007), American politician
 Clare Holman (born 1964), British actress
 Claude Holman (1904–1973), American attorney and politician
 Cliff Holman (1929–2008), American television personality
 David Holman, American television producer
 Derek Holman, (1931–2019), British choral conductor, organist, and composer
 Derk Holman (1916–1982), Dutch ceramist and sculptor
 Diana Holman-Hunt (1913–1993), British memoir writer and art critic
 Dorothy Holman (born 1883), British tennis player
 Eddie Holman (born 1946), American singer
 Edward Holman, Australian politician
 Emily Elizabeth Holman (1854–1925), American architect
 Francis Holman (1729–1784), British maritime painter
 Frank B. Holman (1930–2005), American politician
 Frank E. Holman (1886–1967), American attorney
 Frederick Holman (swimmer) (1885–1913), British breaststroke swimmer, Olympic gold medal winner
 Frederick Van Voorhies Holman (1852–1927), American attorney and civic leader
 Gary Holman (baseball) (born 1944), baseball player
 Gary Holman (politician), Canadian politician
 Hannah Holman, American fashion model
 Hans-Jørgen Holman (1925–1986), Norwegian-American musicologist and educationalist
 Harry Holman (1842–1947), American actor
 Hugh Gordon Holman (1881-1955), Canadian architect
 J. Martin Holman (born 1957), American translator of Japanese literature
 James Holman (1786–1857), British traveller and writer
 James Sanders Holman (1804–1867), American politician
 Jeffrey Paparoa Holman (born 1947), New Zealand poet, writer, and academic
 Jerry Holman, American basketball player
 John Holman (engineer) (1819-1890), Cornish founder of Holman Brothers
 John Holman (NASCAR) (1918–1975), American NASCAR owner
 John Holman (politician) (1872–1925), Australian politician
 John Holman (British Army officer) (1938–2011), British Army officer and first-class cricketer
 John Holman (writer) (born 1951), American short story writer
 Joseph George Holman (1764–1817), English actor and dramatist
 Joseph W. Holman (1890–1952), American architect
 Keith Holman (born 1927), Australian rugby league footballer
 Kwame Holman, American journalist, correspondent, producer and reporter 
 Libby Holman (1904–1971), American singer
 M. Carl Holman (1919–1988), African-American author, poet and playwright
 Marshall Holman (born 1954), American professional bowler
 Matthew J. Holman (born 1967), American astrophysicist
 May Holman (1893–1939), Australian politician
 Michael Holman (priest), British former headmaster of Wimbledon College
 Michael Holman (filmmaker), American artist, writer, filmmaker and musician
 Nat Holman (1896–1995), American Hall of Fame basketball player
 Nels Holman (1861–1946), American politician
 Nicholas Holman (1771-1862), Cornish engineer, father of John Holman of Holman Brothers
 Pablo Holman (born 1988), Chilean musician, member of the band Kudai
 Patrick Holman (born 1945), English cricketer
 Percy Holman (1891–1978), British politician
 Portia Holman (1903–1983), Australian child psychiatrist
 Ralph Holman (born 1917), American biochemist
 Ralph M. Holman (born 1914), American attorney and senior judge
 Ray Holman (born 1944), Trinidadian musician
 Rex Holman (born 1935), American film and television actor
 Rodney Holman (born 1960), American football player
 Rufus C. Holman (1877–1959), American politician
 Ryan Holman (born 1986), Dutch soccer player
 Scott Earl Holman (born 1954), American jazz musician
 Sheri Holman (born 1966), American writer
 Steve Holman (sportscaster) (born 1954), American sports broadcaster
 Theodor Holman (born 1953), Dutch author, script writer, and journalist
 Tomlinson Holman, American film technologist
 Walter Holman (born 1949), American football player
 William Holman (1871–1934), British-born Australian politician
 William S. Holman (1822–1897), American attorney, judge, and politician
 Willie Holman (1945–2002), American football player
 William Steele Holman (1822–1897), Indiana Congressman

See also
 Hollman
Halman (surname)
Harman (surname)

References

Surnames
Occupational surnames
Toponymic surnames
English-language surnames
Dutch-language surnames
Surnames of English origin
Surnames of British Isles origin
Surnames of Dutch origin